Wax lips are the common name of a candy product made of colored and flavored food-grade paraffin wax, molded to resemble a pair of oversized red lips. They were most popular in the 1970s and currently are sold by Tootsie Roll Industries as Wack-O-Wax.

Description 
Wax lips are the common name of a candy product made of colored and flavored food-grade paraffin wax, molded to resemble a pair of oversized red lips. The lips have a bite plate in the back; when the plate is held between the teeth, the wax lips cover the wearer's own lips, to comic effect.  Their popularity among children can be attributed mainly to the comedy of wearing the lips. Although they were intended to be used as a sort of chewing gum after the novelty of the gag wore off, the lips were often simply discarded rather than eaten.

History 
Invented by the American Candy Company in the early 20th century, wax lips became a popular novelty in the United States for many decades, especially during the Halloween season. Wax lips were most popular in the late 1970s and have been referenced extensively in fiction.

The original design of wax lips is proprietary. The patent was obtained by Concord Confections, Ltd. in 2002, which was in turn acquired by Tootsie Roll Industries in 2004. The lips are now produced under the Wack-O-Wax brand name. Other designs include the wax fangs design (which depicts open lips with a mouthful of bloody vampire teeth), black wax moustaches, and horse teeth.

See also
 List of confectionery brands

References

External links
Wack-O-Wax 

Tootsie Roll Industries brands
Candy
Novelty items